Bullets of Love is a 2001 Hong Kong action thriller film produced and directed by Andrew Lau and starring Leon Lai and Asaka Seto.

Plot
Hong Kong Regional Crime Unit inspector Sam Lam (Leon Lai) rapidly raids a transnational criminal organisation and capturing its leader, Night (Terence Yin). Although his crimes were heinous, Night spends a huge sum a team of clever lawyers to defend him, causing the efforts Sam's fiancé, Ann (Asaka Seto), who is the prosecutor of the case, coming to no avail. Eventually, Night received a light sentence of five years imprisonment. Holding a grudge against Sam and Ann for putting him in prison, Night schemes with his older brother, Day (Richard Sun), to orchestrate a plan for revenge.

After the conclusion of the case, Ann and Sam takes a vacation to Paris. Unexpected to them, Day sends a killer who shoots and kills Ann, who was riding an elevator, but does not kill Sam. Ann's death causes Sam to grieve abnormally. Sam decides to quit his job in the police force and opens a bar in Tai O, leading a reclusive life.

Two years later, Sam meets You (Asaka Seto), a Japanese tourist who looks exactly like Ann. Sam cannot help but fall in love with her. One day, Sam accidentally discovers a secret about You, while on the other hand, Night, who won an appeal on his case, was released early and is determined to get back at Sam.

Cast
Leon Lai as Inspector Sam Lam
Asaka Seto as Ann / You
Sandy Lam as the voice of Ann
Terence Yin as Night / Wong Po
Michael Chan as Uncle Ox
Frankie Ng as Uncle Tiger
Hayawaka Saki as The Assassin
Richard Sun as Day / Wong Fung
Ronald Cheng as Ma
Alexander Chan as Ho Ma
Tony Ho as Band Member
Yu Ka-ho as Band Member
Benjamin Yuen as Band Member
Alan Ko
Michael Tse as Cop shot in the street
Poon Hang-sang
Gary Mak
Ankee Leung
Danny Chan
Ho Ka-fai as Policeman
Law Shu-kei as Judge
Prudence Kao as Jojo
Chow Mei-shing as Mao
Ben Yuen as Night's lawyer
Vincent Chik
Luk Oi-ling
Pauline Yeung

Reception

Critical response
Earl Cresssey of DVD Talk rated the film a score of 3.5 out of 5 stars and praises the developed characters, action sequences and suspenseful storyline, while also noting a few logic problems. LoveHKFilm gave the film a mixed review criticizing its emotional hooks and Leon Lai's performances, but praises the performances of Asaka Seto and the supporting cast.

Box office
The film grossed HK$3,587,266 at the Hong Kong box office during its theatrical run from 27 September to 17 October 2001.

References

External links

Bullets of Love at Hong Kong Cinemagic

2001 films
2001 action thriller films
Hong Kong action thriller films
Police detective films
2000s Cantonese-language films
Films directed by Andrew Lau
Films about contract killing
Hong Kong films about revenge
Films set in Hong Kong
Films shot in Hong Kong
Films set in Paris
Films shot in Paris
2000s Hong Kong films